The City Church of Bremgarten (German: Stadtkirche Bremgarten) is a listed heritage building in the city of Bremgarten, Canton of Aargau, Switzerland. It is an important landmark of Bremgarten. It is protected at the level of national importance (A-building), together with three chapels (St. Anna, St. Clara, and the Mother of God).

History
The church was built in 1300 and was consecrated in honor of Saint Mary Magdalene. In 1420 Anna of Brunswick-Lüneburg, the wife of Frederick IV, Duke of Austria, gave all rights to the church to the local hospital, under the condition that a mass in her memory would be served once per year. The mass is still being served. In 1529, in the course of the Reformation, the building was converted into a Protestant church, but in 1532 it became Catholic again, Since 1532, the church has been consecrated in honor of Saint Nicholas.

References

Churches in Aargau
Cultural property of national significance in Aargau
14th-century Roman Catholic church buildings in Switzerland